The Paxico Historic District  includes four commercial contributing buildings in a row at 101–103, 105, 107, and 109 Newbury St. in Paxico, Kansas.  The historic district was listed on the National Register of Historic Places in 1998.

The buildings are near the railroad station and Main Street in the T-plan layout of Paxico.

The Bolton Brothers General Store, a two-story building at 101-103 Newbury, is the corner building in the row.  It has two main two-story sections and a one-story extension to the north, plus a one-story rear wing.

References

Historic districts on the National Register of Historic Places in Kansas
Victorian architecture in Kansas
Buildings and structures completed in 1907
Wabaunsee County, Kansas